Yelena Chernykh (Cyrillic: Елена Черных) (August 24, 1979 – October 4, 2011) was a Russian theatre actress.  She has been called "хрупкая красавица и вместе с тем необычайно выносливая актриса" (a fragile beauty and yet extraordinarily hardy actress).

Death
The 32-year-old actress was killed in a car crash on 4 October 2011 in Novoanninsky, along with fellow actors, 59-year-old Aleksandr Yegorov and 52-year-old Valentina Yudina.  Chernykh and Yegorov, who both died in the same collision, were considered favorite artists of the "Волгоградского музыкально-драматического казачьего театра" (Volgograd Music and Drama Theatre of the Cossack).

At the time her death, Yelena was married to Yegor Chernykh, with whom she had one daughter.

Theater
Her better known theater works include
 Эй, ты, здравствуй! (Hey, you, hello!) by Г. Мамлина (G. Mamlina)
 Андрей-Стрелок и Марья-Голубка (Andrew, Archer and Maria Dove) by И. Токмаковой (I. Tokmakova)
 Хуторяне (Hutoryane) by А. Копкова (A. Kopkova)
 Чубатые ребяты (Curly guys) by Ю. Войтова (Yu Voitova)
 От любви до ненависти (From love to hate) by Н. Старицкого (N. Staritskogo)
 Святочная история (Yule Story) by Чарльза Диккенса (Charles Dickens)
 Эшелон (Echelon) by М.М. Рощина (MM Roshchin)
 От сердца к сердцу (Heart to Heart) by  Ю. Войтова (Yu Voitova)
 Моя граница — моя судьба (My border - my destiny) by  Ю. Войтова (Yu Voitova)
 Кошкин дом (Cat House) by С.Я. Маршака (SY Marshak).

References

External links
 

1979 births
2011 deaths
Russian stage actresses
Road incident deaths in Russia